Rkia El Moukim (born 22 February 1988 in Guelmim) is a Moroccan runner.

Career 
In 2014, El Moukim won the Des Moines International Half Marathon as well as the Paris-Versailles Race, setting a record of 52 min 25s. She finished sixth in the 2014 New York Marathon and tenth in the 2015 London Marathon.

El Moukim qualified to represent Morocco in the 2020 Tokyo Summer Olympics, competing in the Women's Marathon event.

References

External links

 
 
 
 

1988 births
Moroccan female marathon runners
Moroccan female long-distance runners
Olympic athletes of Morocco
Athletes (track and field) at the 2020 Summer Olympics
People from Guelmim
Living people
21st-century Moroccan women
Athletes (track and field) at the 2022 Mediterranean Games
Mediterranean Games bronze medalists for Morocco
Mediterranean Games medalists in athletics